North Pole, Ahoy is a 1934 German comedy film directed by Andrew Marton and starring Walter Riml, Guzzi Lantschner and Gibson Gowland. A film company goes to shoot its latest production in the Arctic.

It was made by the German subsidiary of Universal Pictures, the last feature to be released by the company who withdrew from Germany to Austria following the takeover by the Nazi Party. It was shot partly on location in Greenland. The film's production design was by Fritz Maurischat.

Cast
 Walter Riml as Fietje
 Guzzi Lantschner as Tietje
 Jarmila Marton as Rita Nora
 Gibson Gowland as Leading seaman
 Karl Buchholz as Film Director
 Ludwig Stössel as Director
 Hans Hermann Schaufuß as Professor Pierson
 Senta Söneland as Mrs. Pierson
 Walter Gross
 Nora Nord
 Charly Berger
 Louis Adlon

References

Bibliography

External links 
 

1934 films
1934 comedy films
Films of Nazi Germany
German comedy films
1930s German-language films
Films directed by Andrew Marton
Films shot in Greenland
Universal Pictures films
Films about filmmaking
Films scored by Paul Dessau
German black-and-white films
1930s German films